Trichopsis is a genus of gouramies native to Southeast Asia.

Species
There are currently three recognized species in this genus:
 Trichopsis pumila (J. P. Arnold, 1936) (Pygmy gourami)
 Trichopsis schalleri Ladiges, 1962 (Threestripe gourami)
 Trichopsis vittata (G. Cuvier, 1831) (Croaking gourami)

Relation to humans
Gouramis of the genus Trichopsis are very popular in the aquarium trade.

References

 
Macropodusinae
 
Freshwater fish genera
Taxa named by Giovanni Canestrini
Taxa described in 1860